Gymnothorax polyspondylus is a moray eel found in the eastern central Pacific, around Hawaii. It was first named by Böhlke and Randall in 2000, and is commonly known as the manyvertebrae moray.

References

polyspondylus
Fish described in 2000